Liddon may refer to:

 Henry Parry Liddon (1829–1890), English theologian
 Liddon Island, Nunavut, Canada